A Ronda is one of five parishes in Illano, a municipality within the province and autonomous community of Asturias, in northern Spain. 

The population is 33. The postal code is 33728.

Villages
 El Pato
 A Braña del Pato
 Cabanela
 Castañín
 Ferreiro
 A Soma
 Suacapiya
 Silvareye
 Meisnado

References

Parishes in Illano